Walter Paul "Doc" Gautreau (July 26, 1901 – August 23, 1970) was an American professional baseball player, manager and scout. He threw and batted right-handed.

Gautreau attended The College of the Holy Cross in Worcester, Massachusetts, and the Crusaders went 92-8-1 during his tenure as the team's second baseman. After four games played and seven hitless at bats, his contract was sold to the Boston Braves of the National League in July.  

His tenure with the Braves was curtailed, however, when Boston obtained future Baseball Hall of Fame second baseman Rogers Hornsby for the 1928 campaign. Gautreau spent most of that season in the Class A Eastern League and made his final Major League appearance at the end of September. All told, he appeared in 261 games over four big-league seasons (1925–1928), and batted .257 with 207 hits and 40 stolen bases.

Upon leaving the Majors, Gautreau became a regular with the Montreal Royals of the International League, playing with them for five seasons, including two as playing manager. After his career in uniform, he scouted for the Braves in both Boston and Milwaukee, as well as with the Los Angeles/California Angels. He died in Salt Lake City, Utah, at age 69.

References

1901 births
1970 deaths
Baseball players from Massachusetts
Boston Braves players
Boston Braves scouts
California Angels scouts
College of the Holy Cross alumni
Kansas City Blues (baseball) players
Los Angeles Angels scouts
Major League Baseball second basemen
Milwaukee Braves scouts
Montreal Royals managers
Montreal Royals players
Sportspeople from Cambridge, Massachusetts
Philadelphia Athletics players
Providence Grays (minor league) players
Watertown Townies players